Gerhard "Bibo" Fischer was a German bobsledder who competed in the 1930s. He won five medals at the FIBT World Championships with one gold (Two-man: 1938), three silvers (Two-man: 1931, 1939, Four-man: 1937), and one bronze (Four-man: 1938).

References
Bobsleigh two-man world championship medalists since 1931
Bobsleigh four-man world championship medalists since 1930

German male bobsledders
Possibly living people
Year of birth missing
20th-century German people